Stedcombe was launched at Lyme Regis in 1818. She traded between London and the Cape of Good Hope (CGH; the Cape), and the Cape and the Dutch East Indies. Local pirates at Timor Laut murdered her crew in 1825.

Career
Stedcombe appeared in Lloyd's Register (LR) in 1819 with Rocher, master, ownership at the Cape of Good Hope (CGH; the Cape), and trade London–CGH. "Shadcombe", Rocher, master, sailed from Falmouth for the Cape on 28 December 1818.

A letter dated Cape of Good Hope, 5 July 1821, reported that Stedcombe, Cornell, master, had taken the cargo of  African for Batavia. African, of the Texel, Scholl, master, had put into the Cape on 8 May in a leaky condition and had had to discharge. Stedcombe arrived back at the Cape from Batavia on 12 December.

Stedcomb, G. Barnes, master, left England on 17 June 1824, bound for New South Wales.

Fate
An early report had Stedcombe foundering on passage from London for Tasmania, after leaving part of her cargo at Melville Island.

It turned out that the local inhabitants at Timor Laut had attacked Stedcombe in 1825, killing all but the two crewmen that they then kept as slaves. One of the survivors died c.1836. Stedcombe was on a voyage from Melville Island to Van Diemen's Land. The schooner Essington rescued the last survivor in 1839.

In December 1824 Stedcombe had been at Kupang on her way to the new settlement at Melville Island. At Kupang she encountered , which had arrived there from Melville Island to purchase food supplies for the settlement. Lady Nelson departed on the 19th and Stedcombe on 23 February 1825. In a letter dated 19 May 1825, Barlow wrote 'his schooner [Stedcombe] left this port four days after Johns' departure [in Lady Nelson], in charge of his Chief Mate, neither have returned since. I fear they either have been wrecked or fallen into the hands of the Malay Pirates'.

Citations and references
Citations

References

 

1818 ships
Age of Sail merchant ships of England
Captured ships
Ships attacked and captured by pirates